Sekhar Chandra was an Indian cricketer who played for Himachal Pradesh.

Chandra made a single List A appearance for the side, during the 1994-95 season, against Jammu and Kashmir. From the lower order, he scored 4 runs. While Jammu and Kashmir won the match, the points accrued from the game were later annulled.

External links
Sekhar Chandra at CricketArchive 

Indian cricketers
Himachal Pradesh cricketers
Living people
Year of birth missing (living people)